Tercero is a surname. Notable people with the surname include:

Eduardo Tercero (born 1996), Mexican footballer
Esperanza Tercero (born 1963), Spanish handball player
Gustavo Romero Tercero (born 1970), Spanish criminal
Scott Tercero (born 1981), American football player